Grete Eliassen (born September 21, 1986 in Lutsen, Minnesota) is an American-Norwegian freestyle skier. She won a bronze medal in Slopestyle at the 2011 Winter X Games XV in Aspen, Colorado, behind Kaya Turski and Keri Herman. She has won 6 medals at the Winter X Games in slopestyle and halfpipe events including back to back gold medals in 2005 and 2006. Eliassen serves as the 16th president of the Women's Sports Foundation, effective January 2017.

Early life
Eliassen was born in Lutsen, Minnesota to a Norwegian father and American mother. She started skiing at the young age of two. She grew up near some of the finest mountains in North America. She moved to Norway for a year when she was five. When she returned to the United States, she started playing several different sports: hockey, soccer, basketball, tennis, water-skiing, baseball, cross country skiing, and alpine skiing. When she was 13, Eliassen moved to Lillehammer, Norway. She decided to continue her skiing career there.

Career
A year after Eliassen moved back to Norway, she was named the Norwegian SL National Champion. Soon thereafter, she was selected to join the Norwegian Ski Team. She was on the team for two seasons. At the age of sixteen, Eliassen won the Super-G at the Junior World Championship in France and placed third in slalom skiing at the European Junior Olympics in Slovenia.

Eliassen realized that racing was not the type of skiing that satisfied her and soon after she fell in love with freeskiing. During her first year of competing in freeskiing, she took first place in the Rip Curl Free Ski and the US Open. Since she made her debut, she has won the US Open four times as well as wins at Red Bull Cold Rush and the Dew Tour. She captures back to back gold medals at the Winter X Games. In addition, she also won two silver and two bronze medals at the Winter X Games. She is the only female skier to medal in both the first Halfpipe and Slopestyle X Games events. In 2007, Eliassen won all the open events, US Open, European Open, and Nippon Open. She was named "Women Skier of the Decade" by Fri Flyt magazine.

From fall 2008 until spring 2010, Eliassen co-produced and was featured in the ski film "Say My Name" with one of her sponsors, Red Bull. She won ESPN Best Performance in a Leading Role and IF3 Montreal Best Female Performance for her role in the film.

In 2010, Eliassen broke the Hip Jump World Record. She reached speeds of 60 miles per hour downhill, hit the custom 30 foot hip feature, and soared more than 31 feet in the air. No woman has even come close to breaking her records.

Career Highlights
 2013 FIS World Championship, Slopestyle-3rd place
 2011 Red Bull Cold Rush- 1st place
 2011 Winter X Games, Slopestyle-3rd place
 2010 Set Women's Hip Jump World Record
 2010 Winter X Games, Slopestyle- 3rd place
 2009 Winter X Games, Slopestyle- 2nd place
 2007 US Freeskiing Open, Halfpipe- 1st place
 2007 Winter X Games, Halfpipe- 2nd place
 2006 Winter X Games, Halfpipe- 1st place
 2006 US Open, Halfpipe-1st place
 2005 FIS World Championships, Halfpipe-3rd place
 2005 Winter X Games, Halfpipe-1st place
 2005 US Open, Halfpipe- 1st place
 2005 World FIS World Championships, Halfpipe -3rd place
 2004 US Open, Halfpipe-1st place
 2003 FIS Junior World Championships Super G-1st place
 2003 European Junior Olympics, Slalom-3rd place

Personal life
Eliassen now resides in Salt Lake City, Utah with her husband. She graduated from the University of Utah in May 2013 with a business marketing degree. She enjoys waterskiing, wakeboarding, golf, tennis, rock-climbing, skateboarding and biking when not skiing.

Activism 
Eliassen is also very involved within the community of female athletes. She is very passionate about giving young girls the same opportunities as boys when it comes to sports. Recently Eliassen has been elected to serve as the president of the Women's Sports Foundation.

References

External links

1986 births
Living people
American female freestyle skiers
Norwegian female freestyle skiers
Sportspeople from Rochester, Minnesota
X Games athletes
Sportspeople from Lillehammer
American people of Norwegian descent
Norwegian people of American descent
University of Utah alumni